The list of non-marine molluscs of South Africa is a list of freshwater and land species that form a part of the molluscan fauna of South Africa.

Freshwater gastropods 

Ampullariidae
 Lanistes ovum Troschel, 1845

Pomatiopsidae
 Tomichia cawstoni Connolly, 1939 – endemic
 Tomichia natalensis Connolly, 1939 – endemic
 Tomichia rogersi (Connolly, 1929) – endemic

Thiaridae
 Tarebia granifera (Lamarck, 1822) – non-indigenous
 Thiara amarula (Linnaeus, 1758)
 Melanoides tuberculata (O. F. Müller, 1774)

Paludomidae
 Cleopatra ferruginea (Lea & Lea, 1850)

Lymnaeidae
 Pseudosuccinea columella (Say, 1817) – non-indigenous
 Radix natalensis (Krauss, 1848)

Planorbidae
 Lentorbis carringtoni (de Azevedo et al., 1961)

Land gastropods 

Cyclophoridae
 Afrocyclus bhaca Cole, 2019
 Afrocyclus exsertus (Melvill & Ponsonby, 1903)
 Afrocyclus isipingoensis (Sturany, 1898)
 Afrocyclus oxygala Cole, 2019
 Afrocyclus potteri Cole, 2019
 Chondrocyclus alabastris (Craven, 1880)
 Chondrocyclus amathole Cole, 2019
 Chondrocyclus bathrolophodes Connolly, 1929
 Chondrocyclus convexiusculus (Pfeiffer, 1855)
 Chondrocyclus cooperae Cole, 2019
 Chondrocyclus devilliersi Cole, 2019
 Chondrocyclus herberti Cole, 2019
 Chondrocyclus kevincolei Cole, 2019
 Chondrocyclus langebergensis Cole, 2019
 Chondrocyclus pondoensis Cole, 2019
 Chondrocyclus pulcherrimus Cole, 2019
 Chondrocyclus putealis Connolly, 1939
 Chondrocyclus silvicolus Cole, 2019
 Chondrocyclus trifimbriatus Connolly, 1929
 Cyathopoma chirindae (van Bruggen, 1986)
 Cyathopoma meredithae (van Bruggen, 1983)

Succineidae
 Oxyloma patentissima (Pfeiffer, 1853)

Veronicellidae
 Laevicaulis haroldi Dundee, 1980 – endemic

Subulinidae
 Euonyma laeocochlis (Melvill & Ponsonby, 1896)

Streptaxidae
 Gulella appletoni Bruggen, 1975
 Gulella aprosdoketa Connolly, 1939 – endemic
 Gulella arnoldi (Sturany, 1898)
 Gulella bomvana Cole & Herbert, 2009
 Gulella bruggeni Cole & Herbert, 2009
 Gulella chi Burnup, 1926
 Gulella claustralis Connolly, 1939 – endemic
 Gulella dejae Bursey & Herbert, 2004 
 Gulella farquhari (Melvill & Ponsonby, 1895)
 Gulella fraudator Connolly, 1939
 Gulella hamerae Bursey & Herbert, 2004
 Gulella hodgkinsonae
 Gulella incurvidens Bruggen, 1972
 Gulella latimerae Bursey & Herbert 2004
 Gulella mariae (Melvill & Ponsonby, 1892)
 Gulella munita (Melvill & Ponsonby, 1893)
 Gulella ndibo Cole & Herbert, 2009
 Gulella newmani Bursey & Herbert, 2004
 Gulella peakei continentalis Bruggen, 1975
 Gulella pentheri (Sturany, 1898)
 Gulella phyllisae Burnup, 1914
 Gulella plantii – Plant's gulella snail, endemic
 Gulella pondoensis Connolly, 1939
 Gulella puzeyi Connolly, 1939 – endemic
 Gulella salpinx Herbert, 2002 – endemic
 Gulella sylvia (Melvill & Ponsonby, 1903)
 Gulella tharfieldensis (Melvill & Ponsonby, 1893)
 Gulella tietzae Cole & Herbert, 2009
 Gulella wendalinae Bruggen, 1975

Bothriembryontidae
 Prestonella – the genus with 3 species is endemic to South Africa.
 Prestonella bowkeri (Sowerby, 1889)
 Prestonella nuptialis (Melvill & Ponsonby, 1894)
 Prestonella quadingensis Connolly, 1929

Rhytididae
 Chlamydephorus bruggeni (L. Forcart, 1967)
 Chlamydephorus burnupi (Smith, 1892)
 Chlamydephorus dimidius (Watson, 1915)
 Chlamydephorus gibbonsi W.G. Binney, 1879
 Chlamydephorus lawrencei (L. Forcart, 1963)
 Chlamydephorus parva (H. Watson, 1915)
 Chlamydephorus purcelli (Collinge, 1901) – Purcell's hunter slug, endemic
 Chlamydephorus sexangulus (H. Watson, 1915)
 Chlamydephorus watsoni (L. Forcart, 1967)
 Afrorhytida burseyae D.G. Herbert & A. Moussalli, 2010
 Afrorhytida knysnaensis (L. Pfeiffer, 1846)
 Afrorhytida kraussi (L. Pfeiffer, 1846)
 Afrorhytida trimeni (Melvill & Ponsonby, 1892)
 Capitina calcicola Herbert & Moussalli, 2010
 Capitina schaerfiae (Pfeiffer, 1861)
 Nata aequiplicata Herbert & Moussali, 2016
 Nata dumeticola Benson 1851
 Nata tarachodes (Connolly, 1912)
 Nata vernicosa-erugata
 Nata watsoni Herbert & Moussali, 2016
 Natalina beyrichi (Von Martens, 1890) – Pondoland cannibal snail, endemic
 Natalina cafra (Férussac, 1821)
 Natalina inhluzana (Melvill & Ponsonby, 1894)
 Natalina quekettiana (Melvill & Ponsonby, 1893)
 Natalina reenenensis Connolly, 1939
 Natalina wesseliana Kobelt, 1876 – Tongaland cannibal snail, endemic
 Natella viridescens  (Melvill & Ponsonby, 1891)

Urocyclidae
 Kerkophorus ampliatus (Melvill & Ponsonby, 1899)
 Kerkophorus bicolor Godwin-Austen, 1914
 Kerkophorus cingulatus (Melvill & Ponsonby, 1890)
 Kerkophorus corneus (L. Pfeiffer, 1846)
 Kerkophorus inunctus (Connolly 1939)
 Kerkophorus knysnaensis (Pretson, 1912)
 Kerkophorus melvilli Godwin-Austen, 1912
 Kerkophorus perfragilis Connolly, 1922
 Kerkophorus perlevis (Preston, 1912)
 Kerkophorus piperatus-vittarubra
 Kerkophorus poeppigii (L. Pfeiffer, 1846)
 Kerkophorus pumilio (Melvill & Ponsonby, 1909)
 Kerkophorus phaedimus (Melvill & Ponsonby, 1892)
 Kerkophorus piperatus Herbert, 2017
 Kerkophorus puzeyi  (Connolly, 1939)
 Kerkophorus russofulgens (Melvill & Ponsonby, 1909)
 Kerkophorus scrobicolus Herbert, 2017
 Kerkophorus terrestris Herbert, 2017
 Kerkophorus vandenbroeckii (Craven, 1881)
 Kerkophorus vitalis (Melvill & Ponsonby, 1908)
 Kerkophorus vittarubra Herbert, 2017
 Kerkophorus zonamydrus (Melvill & Ponsonby, 1890)
 Microkerkus arnotti (Benson, 1864)
 Microkerkus burnupi (Godwin-Austen, 1914)
 Microkerkus chrysoprasinus (Melvill & Ponsonby, 1892)
 Microkerkus fuscicolor (Melvill & Ponsonby, 1892)
 Microkerkus leucospira (L. Pfeiffer, 1857)
 Microkerkus maseruensis Connolly, 1929
 Microkerkus pondoensis (Godwin-Austen, 1912)
 Microkerkus sibaya Herbert, 2017
 Microkerkus symmetricus (Craven, 1881)
 Microkerkus transvaalensis (Craven, 1881)
 Ptilototheca soutpansbergensis Herbert 2016
 Selatodryas luteosoma-roseosoma
 Selatodryas luteosoma Herbert, 2017
 Selatodryas roseosoma Herbert, 2017
 Sheldonia aloicola (Melvill & Ponsonby, 1890)
 Sheldonia asthenes (Melvill & Ponsonby, 1907)
 Sheldonia caledonensis (Godwin-Austen, 1912)
 Sheldonia capsula (Benson, 1864)
 Sheldonia cotyledonis (Benson, 1850)
 Sheldonia crawfordi (Melvill & Ponsonby, 1890)
 Sheldonia fingolandensis Herbert, 2017
 Sheldonia hudsoniae (Benson, 1864)
 Sheldonia monsmaripi Herbert, 2016
 Sheldonia natalensis (Pfeiffer, 1846)
 Sheldonia phytostylus (Benson, 1864)
 Sheldonia puzeyi (Connolly, 1939)
 Sheldonia transvaalensis (Craven, 1880)
 Sheldonia trotteriana (Benson, 1848)
 Sheldonia wolkbergensis (Herbert, 2016)

Charopidae
 Trachycystis clifdeni Connolly, 1932 – endemic
 Trachycystis haygarthi (Melvill & Ponsonby, 1899) – endemic
 Trachycystis placenta (Melvill & Ponsonby, 1899) – endemic

Bivalves

See also 
 List of marine molluscs of South Africa

Lists of molluscs of surrounding countries:
 List of non-marine molluscs of Namibia
 List of non-marine molluscs of Botswana
 List of non-marine molluscs of Zimbabwe
 List of non-marine molluscs of Mozambique
 List of non-marine molluscs of Swaziland
 List of non-marine molluscs of Lesotho

References

External links 
 website of Dr. Dai Herbert with projects and publications
 Govender V. (2007). "Patterns of Distribution, Diversity and Endemism of Terrestrial Molluscs in South Africa". Thesis. School of Biological and Conservation Sciences, University of KwaZulu-Natal. 219 pp. PDF.
 de Kock K. N. & Wolmarans C. T. (1998). "A re-evaluation of the occurrence of freshwater molluscs in the Kruger National Park". Koedoe - African Protected Area Conservation and Science 45(1): . , PDF.
 de Kock K. N., Wolmarans C. T. & du Preez L. H. (2002) "Freshwater mollusc diversity in the Kruger National Park: a comparison between a period of prolonged drought and a period of exceptionally high rainfall". Koedoe - African Protected Area Conservation and Science 45(2): 1–11. , PDF.
 Wolmarans C. T. & de Kock K. N. (2006). "The current status of freshwater molluscs in the Kruger National Park". Koedoe - African Protected Area Conservation and Science 49(2): 39–44. . PDF.

 Mollusc, Non Marine

Mollusc, non-marine
South Africa02
South Africa